"Silver Threads and Golden Needles" is a country song written by Dick Reynolds and Jack Rhodes.  It was first recorded by Wanda Jackson in 1956. The original lyrics, as performed by Jackson, contain a verse not usually included in later versions, which also often differed in other minor details.

Other versions

 In September 1962 a version by UK folk-pop trio the Springfields – featuring Dusty Springfield – reached number 20 on Billboard's Hot 100. It was the first single by a British group to reach the top 20 of the Hot 100.
 Skeeter Davis recorded a version in 1962 after the Springfields hit for an album track; Davis's version was released as a single by RCA in several international markets.
 Jody Miller released a version in 1965 which peaked at number 54 on the US Billboard Hot 100.
 The Cowsills recorded the song on their studio album IIxII.  It peaked number 77 on the US Billboard charts in September 1969.
 Linda Ronstadt recorded and released two versions of the song: the first, a pure country song on her 1969 solo debut album Hand Sown ... Home Grown; the second, a country rock crossover version for her 1973 Don't Cry Now album. The second version was released in January 1974 as a single and was Ronstadt's first country chart hit, peaking at number 20. This version also hit the Hot 100, entering the chart on April 6, 1974, and peaking at number 67.
 In 1993, the country trio Dolly Parton, Tammy Wynette and Loretta Lynn recorded the song together on the album Honky Tonk Angels; the song was released as a single, along with an accompanying video. It peaked at number 68 on the Billboard Hot Country Singles & Tracks chart. Parton had previously performed the song at numerous points over the years, including on her 1976-77 variety show, Dolly!, on which she was joined by guests Linda Ronstadt and Emmylou Harris.

References

1956 singles
1962 singles
1965 singles
1974 singles
1993 singles
RCA Records singles
Asylum Records singles
The Springfields songs
Wanda Jackson songs
Skeeter Davis songs
Jody Miller songs
Dolly Parton songs
Linda Ronstadt songs
Cowsills songs
Loretta Lynn songs
Tammy Wynette songs
Songs written by Jack Rhodes